Michał Mikołaj Ogiński (April 25, 1849 – March 24, 1902) was a Polish-Lithuanian noble, marshal of the Telšiai county's nobility, cultural activist.

Family and life
He graduated from the men's gymnasium in Šiauliai. Michał Ogiński inherited his father's palace in Zaliessie, but did not want to live there. In 1873, he bought the estate in Plungė from Alexander Zubov and built Plungė Manor designed by Karol Lorenz or Friedrich August Stüler. 

The wedding took place in Czerniejewo during the Kulturkampf period and was a Polish patriotic demonstration. The couple initially lived in Rietavas, and moved to Plungė after the palace was built. They were active in social and cultural activities. Ogiński founded a private orchestra and a music school, where Lithuania's most prominent composer Mikalojus Konstantinas Čiurlionis took lessons in 1889–1893. With the help of Ogiński, he was later educated in Warsaw. 

Ogiński fell ill and went to France for treatments. He died suddenly without an heir in Nice on March 24, 1902. In 1909, his brother  also died childless, thus extinguishing the senatorial line of the family. After her husband's death, Maria Ogiński lived in Plungė and continued the social activities she had begun with her husband. At the beginning of World War I, she settled in Vilnius, and in 1918 went to Poznań, where she died on March 22, 1945. Her estate was taken over by the Lithuanian government in 1921.

Activities
Ogiński accumulated works of art, archaeological finds, hunting trophies, and a book collection. Among the collections, the collection of family portraits, consisting of about 100 canvases and sculptures, was of particular value. The collection included paintings by Marcello Bacciarelli, Bernardo Bellotto, Johann Baptist von Lampi the Elder. Among the family heirlooms were two silver Hetman's buławas.

Together with his brother Bohdan Ogińki, he organized periodic agricultural and industrial exhibitions at their estate. He helped peasant children with their education. This was the first telephone line in Lithuania.

After the Kražiai massacre, he informed Emperor Alexander III of the events.

Plungė was mostly inhabited by Jews. On June 29, 1894, a fire broke out there, 80 Christian and 323 Jewish houses burned down, as well as the Great Synagogue and other houses of worship. Many families were taken in by Bohdan Ogiński in Rietavas. Michał Ogiński received fire victims at his palace. He then undertook the reconstruction of the town. He built a brick trading house, a new bathhouse, and borrowed 4,000 rubles to rebuild the Great Synagogue.

References

Bibliography 

 
 
 

Ogiński family
1849 births
1902 deaths
19th-century Polish nobility
19th-century Lithuanian nobility